One Day at a Time may refer to:


Television series
 One Day at a Time (1975 TV series), an American sitcom that ran from 1975 to 1984
 One Day at a Time (2017 TV series), the Netflix and Pop reboot of the 1970s–1980s sitcom

Music
 One Day at a Time (Joan Baez album), 1970
 One Day at a Time (Cristy Lane album), 1981
 "One Day at a Time" (song), 1974 country/Christian song written by Marijohn Wilkin and Kris Kristofferson, recorded by many artists
 "One Day at a Time (Em's Version)", 2004 single by 2Pac with Eminem featuring Outlawz
 One Day at a Time, 1999 album by Foster and Allen
 "One Day at a Time", a song by Enrique Iglesias on his 2010 album Euphoria
 "One Day at a Time", a 1970 song written by Joe Babcock, first performed by Porter Wagoner & Dolly Parton on the album Once More
 "One Day (At a Time)", a song by John Lennon on the 1973 album Mind Games
 "One Day at a Time", a song by The Knack on their 2001 album Normal as the Next Guy
 "One Day at a Time", a song by Lynyrd Skynyrd on their 2012 album Last of a Dyin' Breed
 "One Day at a Time", a song by Jonas Brothers on their 2006 album It's About Time
 "One Day at a Time", a song by Joe Walsh on his 2012 album Analog Man
 "One Day at a Time", a song by Jeremy Camp on his 2002 album Stay

Books
 One Day at a Time (novel), 2009 novel by Danielle Steel
 One Day at a Time, 2011 childhood memoir by Susan Lewis

See also
 One Step at a Time (disambiguation)